Shooting at the Friendship Games was contested at the Dynamo Shooting Range in Moscow, Soviet Union between 19 and 25 August 1984.

Medal summary

Men's events

Women's events

Medal table

See also
 Shooting at the 1984 Summer Olympics

References

Shooting
1984 in shooting sports
1984 in Soviet sport
Friendship Games
Friendship Games